Mary Ann Wrighten Pownall, née Mary Matthews, (b. 1751, d. 12 August 1796) was an English singer, actress and composer.

Life
Mary Ann Matthews was born in England of a jeweler father and shop-keeper mother. She was apprenticed to organist Charley Griffith where she learned music, and made her debut on the stage at about age 15. She married actor James Wrighten in about 1769 in Birmingham, and the couple came to London to work in Drury Lane, where she quickly became successful as a singer and actress with Garrick and Sheridan at Drury Lane and Covent Garden.

The couple had two daughters, Mary and Charlotte. They divorced in 1786 in a public scandal, and Mary Ann Wrighten emigrated to the United States to work for theater manager John Henry. Her first American appearance was at the Southwark Theater in Philadelphia in 1792, billed as Mrs. (Hugh) Pownall. She also appeared in New York City, and settled in Charleston, where she died during a yellow fever epidemic in 1796.

She wrote an autobiography entitled An Apology for the Life and Conduct of Mrs Mary Wrighten, Late a Favourite Actress and Singer, of Drury Lane Theatre, and Vauxhall Gardens.

Works
In 1784 Wrighten published Four Ballads:

I Could Not Help Laughing at That
Kiss Me Now or Never
Twas Yes, Kind Sir and Thank You, Too
Young Willy

She is also credited with:
Jemmy of the Glen (ca. 1790)

References

External links
 

1751 births
1796 deaths
British classical composers
Women classical composers
English women singers
English stage actresses
18th-century English actresses
18th-century classical composers
18th-century women composers